The Meertens Institute (Dutch Meertens Instituut) in Amsterdam is a research institute for Dutch language and culture within the Royal Netherlands Academy of Arts and Sciences (Koninklijke Nederlandse Akademie van Wetenschappen or KNAW).

Its two departments are Dutch ethnology, focusing on indigenous and exotic cultures in the Netherlands and their interaction, and Variation, focusing on structural, dialectal, and sociolinguistic research on language variation within the Netherlands, with an emphasis on grammar and onomastic variety.

History 
The institute began in 1930 as a Dialect Office; the Folklore office was added in 1940, and Onomastics Office in 1948. These three bureaus came under the umbrella of the Central Commission for Dutch Social Research. The Secretary of the three bureaus, P.J. Meertens, was the first director and retired in 1965.  The institute was renamed PJ Meertens Institute in 1979.  In 1998 it was renamed as simply the Meertens Institute.  Since 2001, the institute also houses the Secretariat of the International Society for Ethnology and Folklore (SIEF). In September 2016 the Meertens has moved to the historic 'Spinhuis' building in downtown Amsterdam, jointly with the Huygens/ING institute for the history of the Netherlands (also a KNAW institute, coming from The Hague).

The ethnology department is well known for its research in and databases on Dutch songs and folktales, pilgrimage culture and saint cults, probate inventories, farmhouses, feast and rituals and religious cultures. The audio collection in the field of phonetics with recordings in the field of speech acquisition and dialects, formed at the University of Amsterdam by Dr. Louise Kaiser and Meertens, is housed at the Meertens Institute. The Meertens Institute also hosts a project on alternative medicine.

Directors

External links

References

Research institutes in the Netherlands
Organisations based in Amsterdam